Praroman is a locality in the canton of Fribourg, Switzerland. An independent municipality in the district of Sarine, it merged with neighboring municipalities in 2003 to form Le Mouret.

External links
 

Former municipalities of Switzerland
Villages in the canton of Fribourg